The following is a list of toll roads.  Toll roads are roads on which a toll authority collects a fee for use.  This list also contains toll bridges and toll tunnels. Lists of these subsets of toll roads can be found in List of toll bridges and List of toll tunnels.

Albania
A1

Argentina 
 Autopista Pascual Palazzo
 Tigre Access

Australia

Sydney, New South Wales 
 Sydney Harbour Bridge 
 Sydney Harbour Tunnel
 M1 Eastern Distributor
 M2 Hills Motorway
 Lane Cove Tunnel (formerly Lane Cove Valley Freeway under the 1960s Sydney Freeway Plan)
 NorthConnex
 WestConnex (M4 and M8 complete, M4-M5 Link Under Construction)
 M4 Motorway_(Sydney)
 M5 Motorway
 Westlink M7
 Cross City Tunnel

Brisbane, Queensland 
 Sir Leo Hielscher Bridges
 Go Between Bridge
 M2 Logan Motorway
 M5 Legacy Way
 M7 Airport Link
 M7 Clem Jones Tunnel
 East–West Distributor Motorway (Proposed)

Melbourne, Victoria 
 CityLink
 Domain Tunnel
 Burnley Tunnel
 EastLink
 North East Link (Proposed)

Austria

Main roads, open all year:
 Arlbergtunnel (S16)
 Brennerautobahn (A13), between Schönberg im Stubaital and the border to Italy
 Felbertauerntunnel
 Gerlospass, only new road, old road is still open and toll-free
 Karawanken Tunnel (motorway) (A11)
 Two tunnels on the Pyhrnautobahn (A9) (Gleinalm and Bosruck tunnels)
 Tauernautobahn (A10), between Flachauwinkl and Rennweg am Katschberg

But also all Controlled and Limited Access Roads (A # Autobahn = freeways and S # Schnellstraße = highways) via a sticker.
http://www.asfinag.at/home-en for more information

Several mountain roads also charge tolls and are open only in summer:
 Grossglockner High Alpine Road (Großglockner-Hochalpenstraße)
 Silvretta Hochalpenstraße
 Timmelsjoch Hochalpenstrasse

Belarus 
 М1/E30 - Brest (Kozlovichi)–Minsk–Russian Border (Red’ki)	
 M2 - Minsk–Minsk National Airport	
 M3 - Minsk–Vitebsk	
 M4 - Minsk–Mogilev	
 M5/E271 - Minsk–Gomel	
 M6/E28 - Minsk–Grodno–Polish Border (Bruzgi)

Belgium 
 Liefkenshoek Tunnel

Brazil

Bahia

 (BA-093) BA-093|Sistema BA-093
 (BA-099) Estrada do Coco
 (BR-116) Rodovia Presidente Dutra
 (BR-324) Rodovia Salvador-Feira

São Paulo

 (BR-116) Rodovia Presidente Dutra
 (BR-381) Rodovia Fernão Dias
 (SP-021) Rodoanel Mário Covas
 (SP-070) Rodovia Ayrton Senna
 (SP-150) Rodovia Anchieta
 (SP-160) Rodovia dos Imigrantes
 (SP-280) Rodovia Castelo Branco
 (SP-310) Rodovia Washington Luís
 (SP-330) Rodovia Anhangüera
 (SP-348) Rodovia dos Bandeirantes

Canada

Alberta

British Columbia
 Golden Ears Bridge Toll Removal On September 1, 2017
 Port Mann Bridge Toll Removal On September 1, 2017
 Replacement for the Pattullo Bridge (Planned)
 Coquihalla Highway (Former toll road)

New Brunswick
 Saint John Harbour Bridge (Former toll bridge)

Nova Scotia
 Cobequid Pass C$4
 Angus L. Macdonald Bridge C$1.25
 A. Murray MacKay Bridge C$1.25

Ontario 
Tolled international crossings to United States
 Ambassador Bridge
 Blue Water Bridge
 Detroit–Windsor Tunnel
 Ogdensburg–Prescott International Bridge
 Peace Bridge
 Queenston–Lewiston Bridge
 Rainbow Bridge
 Sault Ste. Marie International Bridge
 Thousand Islands Bridge
 Seaway International Bridge (Three Nations Crossing)
 Whirlpool Rapids Bridge

Tolled highways and expressways
 Ontario Highway 407

Formerly tolled roadways

 Burlington Bay James N. Allan Skyway (tolls collected from 1958 to 1973)
 Garden City Skyway (tolls collected from 1963 to 1973)
 Ontario Highway 412
 Ontario Highway 418

Planned but cancelled high-occupancy toll lanes

 Queen Elizabeth Way

Prince Edward Island
 Confederation Bridge

Quebec 
 A25 bridge
 Autoroute 30

Formerly tolled 

 Champlain Bridge
 Jacques Cartier Bridge
 Laurentian Autoroute
 Eastern Autoroute
 Chomedey Autoroute
 North Shore Autoroute

Chile 
 Costanera Norte
 Autopista del Sol
 Chile Highway 5
 Autopista Troncal Sur
 Autopista del Itata
 Autopistas de Antofagasta
 Autopistas del Desierto
 Autopista Rutas del Pacifico
 Autopista Rutas del Biobio
 Autopista Los Libertadores
 Autopista los Andes
 Autopista Vespucio Norte Express
 Autopista Vespucio Sur

China

Beijing 
 6th Ring Road (Beijing)
 Airport Expressway (Beijing)
 Badaling Expressway
 Jingcheng Expressway
 Jingha Expressway
 Jingjintang Expressway
 Jingkai Expressway
 Jingshen Expressway
 Jingshi Expressway
 Jingtong Expressway
 Jingzhang Expressway

Others 
 Guangshen Expressway
 Tangjin Expressway
 Xuanda Expressway
 Yingbin Expressway

Croatia

Motorways 

A1 - Lučko - Karamatići
A2 -  of  tolled: Trakošćan - Zaprešić
A3 -  of  tolled: Bregana - Bobovica and Rugvica - Lipovac
A4 -  of  tolled: Goričan - Sveta Helena
A5 - Osijek - Svilaj
A6 -  of  tolled: Bosiljevo 2 - Kikovica
A7 -  of  tolled: Rupa - Jurdani
A8 -  of  tolled: Kanfanar - Cerovlje
A9 - Umag - Pula
A10 - Kula Norinska - Ploče
A11 - Velika Gorica Jug - Lekenik

Tunnels 

Učka Tunnel

Denmark
Great Belt Fixed Link
Øresund Bridge
Fjord Link Frederikssund

Faroe Islands
Vágatunnilin
Norðoyatunnilin

France

Germany
Warnow Tunnel
Herrentunnel
LKW-Maut A nationwide toll on large trucks.

Hong Kong 

 Aberdeen Tunnel
 Cross-Harbour Tunnel
 Eagle's Nest Tunnel and Sha Tin Heights Tunnel
 Eastern Harbour Crossing
 Lion Rock Tunnel
 Shing Mun Tunnels
 Tai Lam Tunnel
 Tai Wai Tunnel
 Tate's Cairn Tunnel
 Tseung Kwan O Tunnel
 Western Harbour Crossing

India
Gurgaon to Simla

Nizamabad to Nellor
Adilabad to Kurnool(AP) (NH 7, New NH 44)
Hyderabad to Raigiri (NH 202, New NH 163 towards Warangal)luk
Sangareddy (Hyderabad) to Vijayawada(AP) (NH 9, New NH 65)
Hyderabad to Damarcharla

Andhra Pradesh
National Highway 5 (New NH65) (Tada to Srikakulam)
Hyderabad to Chennai (New No. NAM Expressway)
Kurnool to Bangalore (KA) (NH 7, New NH 44)
Kurnool to Kadapa (Rayalaseema Expressway)
Kodad (TG) to Vijayawada (NH 9, New NH 16)
Eluru NH5 (New NH16)
Tanuku NH5 (New NH16)
Vijayawada to Visakhapatnam

Maharashtra
Mumbai Pune Expressway, Mumbai
Western Expressway, Mumbai
Eastern Expressway, Mumbai
Sion Panvel Expressway, Mumbai
Western Freeway, Mumbai
Eastern Freeway, Mumbai
Mumbai Vadodara Expressway, Mumbai to Gujarat
Mumbai Nashik Expressway,  Mumbai to Nashik
Pune to Satara
Satara to Karad to Kolhapur
Shil Phata to Kalyan
Pune to Solapur
Airoli to Mulund

Delhi
DND Flyway
Delhi Gurgaon Expressway
Taj Expressway
Ganga Expressway
Delhi Faridabad Skyway - DF Skyway

Uttar Pradesh
Taj Expressway (Under Construction)
Ganga Expressway (proposed)
Kanpur Metropolitan Expressway (Under Construction)

Karnataka
  NH 4 from Nelamangala till Maharashtra border
  NH 4 from Krishnarajapuram till Tamil Nadu border
  NH 48 from Nelamangala till Hassan
NH 50 from Bijapur till Hospet
  Bengaluru Elevated Tollway
  Bangalore - Nelamangala Expressway
  Bangalore - Kempegowda International Airport (KIA) Expressway
  Brahamarakotlu Toll Plaza - National Highway 73 Mangalore Bangalore National Highway
  Talapady Toll Gate - NH 66

Tamil Nadu
  East Coast Road (ECR) from Chennai to Pondicherry
  Chennai Bye Pass Road from Irumbuliyur, Chennai to NH4 Madhavaram, Chennai
  Chennai ECR - Sholinganallur Road from ECR, Chennai to Sholinganallur, Chennai
  Chennai OMR - Medavakkam Road from Sholinganallur, Chennai to Medavakkam, Chennai
  NH 47 Salem to Coimbatore Expressway / Industrial Corridor
  NH 67 Coimbatore to Trichy
  NH 7 Hosur to Krishnagiri
  NH 4 Krishnagiri to Chennai
  NH 45 Chennai to Villupuram
  NH 7 Krishnagiri to Salem
  NH 45B Madurai to Tuticorin (Nearing completion)
  NH 45 Dindigul to Trichy
  NH 45 Villupuram to Trichy
  NH 7 Salem to Madurai  (Nearing completion)
  NH 7A Tirunelveli to Tuticorin
 Chennai  to Ennore Express Way (Inner Ring Road & Manali Oil Refinery Rd.)
  NH 45B Madurai to Trichy
 NH 83 Thanjavur to Trichy

Indonesia

Iran
 Freeway 2
 Freeway 5
 Freeway 7
 Shahid Kalantary Bridge (Tabriz-Urmia)

Ireland
M1 Motorway - Between Junction 7 and Junction 10 (15 km) 
M3 motorway - Between Junction 5 and 6 (11 km) / Junction 9 and 10 (11 km) 
M4 motorway - Between Junction 8 and Junction 10 (28.5 km) 
M6 motorway - Between Junction 15 and Junction 16 (26.5 km) 
M7/M8 motorway - Between Junction 18 and Junction 21 (27 km) / Junction 3 on the M8 and Junction 18 (23 km) 
M8 motorway - Between Junction 15 and Junction 17 (13 km) 
N25 Waterford city bypass (Suir River Bridge) - Between Junction for the M9/N24 and the Junction for R710 (3 km) 
Limerick Tunnel - Between Junction 2 and Junction 4 on the N18 Road (6 km) 
East-Link (Dublin Port)
Dublin Port Tunnel
West-Link (M50 Motorway, Dublin) - Between Junction 6 and Junction 7 (4 km)

Israel
Highway 6 (Yitzhak Rabin Cross Israel Highway)
Carmel Tunnels
 Express Lane in Highway 1

Italy
Almost all the so-called "autostrada" are toll roads. Some examples:
Autostrada A1 (Italy)
Autostrada A4 (Italy)
Autostrada A5 (Italy)
Autostrada A6 (Italy)
Autostrada A7 (Italy)
Autostrada A10 (Italy)
Autostrada A12 (Italy)
Autostrada A18 (Italy)
Autostrada A20 (Italy)
Autostrada A32 (Italy)

Japan
Almost all expressways in Japan are toll roads.

East Japan
(operated by NEXCO East Japan)
 E7 E46 Akita Expressway
 E4A Aomori Expressway
 E49 Ban-etsu Expressway
 E38 E61 Dōtō Expressway
 E4A Hachinohe Expressway
 E51 Higashi-Kantō Expressway
 E5 Hokkaidō Expressway
 E8 Hokuriku Expressway
 E6 Jōban Expressway
 E18 Jōshin-etsu Expressway
 E46 Kamaishi Expressway
 E17 Kan-Etsu Expressway
 C4 E66 Ken-Ō Expressway
 E50 Kita-Kantō Expressway
 E19 Nagano Expressway
 E7 Nihonkai-Tōhoku Expressway
 E5A Sasson Expressway
 E65 Shin-Kūkō Expressway
 E14 Tateyama Expressway
 E4 E13 E48 Tōhoku Expressway
 E13 Tōhoku-Chūō Expressway
 C3 Tokyo Gaikan Expressway
 E48 Yamagata Expressway

Central Japan
(operated by NEXCO Central Japan)
 E52 Chūbu-Ōdan Expressway
 E20 E52 Chūō Expressway
 E23 Higashi-Meihan Expressway
 E8 Hokuriku Expressway
 E23 Ise Expressway
 E1A Isewangan Expressway
 C4 Ken-Ō Expressway
 E42 Kisei Expressway
 E1 Meishin Expressway
 E19 Nagano Expressway
 E1A Shin-Meishin Expressway
 E52 Shin-Tōmei Expressway
 E41 Tōkai-Hokuriku Expressway
 E1 Tōmei Expressway

West Japan
(operated by NEXCO West Japan)
 E2A E29 E73 E74 Chūgoku Expressway
 E74 Hamada Expressway
 E26 E42 Hanwa Expressway
 E29 Harima Expressway
 E10 Higashi-Kyūshū Expressway
 E74 Hiroshima Expressway
 E2A Kanmonkyo Bridge
 E71 Kansai-Kūkō Expressway
 E26 E42 Kinki Expressway
 E32 Kōchi Expressway
 E3 Kyūshū Expressway
 E27 Maizuru-Wakasa Expressway
 E54 Matsue Expressway
 E11 E56 Matsuyama Expressway
 E1 Meishin Expressway
 E10 Miyazaki Expressway
 E34 Nagasaki Expressway
 E25 Nishi-Meihan Expressway
 E34 Ōita Expressway
 E73 Okayama Expressway
 E58 Okinawa Expressway
 E54 Onomichi Expressway
 E9 San-in Expressway
 E2 Sanyō Expressway
 E1A Shin-Meishin Expressway
 E11 Takamatsu Expressway
 E32 Tokushima Expressway
 E73 Yonago Expressway
 E28 Kobe-Awaji-Naruto Expressway
 E76 Nishiseto Expressway
 E30 Seto-Chūō Expressway

Urban Expressways
 Fukuoka & Kitakyūshū Expressways
 Hanshin Expressway
 Hiroshima Expressway (urban)
 Nagoya Expressway
 Shuto Expressway
 Tokyo Expressway

Malaysia 
 PLUS Expressway Berhad

Mexico

Federal highways

The first tolled Mexican federal highway, between Amacuzac, State of Mexico, and Iguala, opened in 1952 and provided the first partial high-speed connection on the Mexico-Acapulco route. Dozens of toll highways now exist in Mexico, referred to as autopistas or supercarreteras.

Most federal toll roads are four lanes, though some, especially in mountainous areas, are two. Toll (quota) roads provide high-speed alternatives to non-toll federal highways as well as bypasses of major and mid-sized cities.

State highways
Aside from federal highways whose concessions are held by state government agencies, such as much of Fed 45D in Chihuahua and Zacatecas or Fed 2D from La Rumorosa to Mexicali, Baja California, there are also state toll roads, whose concessions were issued by state governments.

Netherlands
Kiltunnel
Westerscheldetunnel

Norway

 Åkrafjorden on E134
 Atlantic Ocean Road between Kristiansund and Averøy, National Road 64
 Bergen city toll ring
 Bærum/Oslo toll on the crossing of the municipality border, E18, National Road 160 and 168
 Eiksund Tunnel, the world's deepest subsea tunnel, between Ørsta/Volda and Ulsteinvik/Hareid, National Road 653
 Fatla Tunnel between Sogndal and Leikanger, National Road 55
 Finnøy Fixed Link between Rennesøy and Finnøy/Talgje, National Road 519
 Fjærland Tunnel between Jølster and Fjærland, National Road 5
 Folgefonna Tunnel between Odda and Kvinnherad, National Road 551
 Frøya Tunnel between Hitra and Frøya, National Road 714
 Gardermoen–Kolomoen, the main northwards highway from Oslo, on E6
 Gausdal on National Road 255
 Gjesdal on National Road 45
 Godøystraumen on National Road 17
 Halsnøy tunnel between mainland Kvinnherad and Halsnøy, National Road 544
 Helgeland Bridge north of Sandnessjøen on National Road 17
 Hitra Tunnel between the island Hitra and the mainland, on National Road 714
 Horten, city road tax on National Road 19
 Imarsund Bridge between Aure and Tustna on National Road 680
 Kløfta–Nybakk on National Road 2, just off E6
 Krifast on E39
 Kristiansand toll ring
 Kristiansand–Grimstad on E18
 Kvinesheia on E39
 Listerpakken on E39
 Lunner–Gardermoen on E16
 Namsos city toll ring
 Naustdal Tunnel between Førde and Florø on National Road 5
 North Cape Tunnel on E69 to Magerøøya island
 Oslo city toll ring
 Oslofjord Tunnel on national road 23 between Hurum and Drøbak
 Osterøy Bridge on national road 566 between the mainland and Osterøy island
 Raufoss on National Road 4
 Setesdal on National Road 9
 Stavanger municipal toll ring
 Straum Bridge on National Road 661
 Svinesund Bridge on E6
 Sykkylv Bridge, municipal road
 Triangle Link on E39
 Tromsø petrol toll
 Trondheim city toll system
 Trondheim–Stjørdal on E6
 Tussen Tunnel as a shortcut to National Road 64 between Molde and Elnesvågen
 Tønsberg toll ring
 Østfold on E6 and E18
 Øysand–Thamshavn on E39 between Trondheim and Orkanger
 Vestfold on E18, divided in two sections: north and south
 Vigra Fixed Link on National Road 658

Madagascar 

 Antananarivo–Toamasina toll highway

Morocco

 Casablanca–Safi
 Casablanca–Marrakesh
 Casablanca–Rabat
 Fes–Oujda
 Marrakesh–Agadir
 Rabat–Fes
 Rabat–Tanger
 Tétouan–Fnideq

New Zealand
 Northern Motorway section from Orewa Interchange to Puhoi
 Takitimu Drive (aka Route K), Tauranga
 Tauranga Eastern Link

Formerly tolled
 Auckland Harbour Bridge (became a free road on 30 March 1984)
 Lyttelton road tunnel (became a free road on 1 April 1979)
 Tauranga Harbour Bridge (became a free road in July 2001)

Panama
 Corridor Sur - South of Panama City, Punta Pacifica - Tocumen Int'l Airport
 Corridor Norte - North of Panama City
 Conexion Corridor Sur y Norte - Panama City, will connect both highways, sections of it are still being planned, some are already being built.

Philippines
North Luzon Expressway 
South Luzon Expressway
Metro Manila Skyway 
STAR Tollway 
NAIA Expressway
Muntinlupa–Cavite Expressway
Manila–Cavite Expressway 
Subic Freeport Expressway
Subic–Clark–Tarlac Expressway 
Tarlac–Pangasinan–La Union Expressway
Cebu-Cordova Link Expressway
Cavite-Laguna Expressway

Poland
Autostrada A1
Autostrada A2
Autostrada A4

Russia
 Toll road from Moscow to Saint Petersburg
 Western Rapid Diameter in Saint Petersburg

Sri Lanka
 Colombo-Matara Expressway
 Colombo-Katunayake Expressway

South Africa
Toll Roads (60 Toll Gates)

 N1  
Huguenot, Vaal, Grasmere, Verkeerdevlei, Stormvoël, Zambesi, Pumulani, Wallmansthal, Murrayhill, Hammanskraal, Carousel, Maubane, Kranskop, NYL, Sebetiela, Baobab, Capricorn
 N2  
Tsitsikamma, Izotsha, Oribi, Umtentweni, oThongathi, King Shaka Airport, Mvoti, Mandini, Dokodweni, Mtunzini
 N3 
Mariannhill, Mooi, Treverton, Bergville, Tugela, Tugela East, Wilge, De Hoek,
 N4 
Swartruggens, Kroondal, Marikana, Buffelspoort, Brits, K99, Doornpoort, Donkerhoek West, Cullinan, Diamond Hill, Valtaki East, Ekandustria East, Middelburg, Machadodorp, Nkomazi
 N17
Gosforth, Dalpark, Denne, Leandra, Trichardt, Ermelo
 R30
Brandfort
 M4 (Pretoria)
 Quagga, Pelindaba
 M6 (Cape Town)
 Chapmans Peak Drive

E-Toll in Johannesburg & Pretoria (43 electronic systems)

 N1
17 electronic systems 
 N3
8 electronic systems 
 N12
9 electronic systems 
 R21
9 electronic systems

Sweden
Øresund Bridge - bridge toll - E20
Stockholm congestion tax
Gothenburg congestion tax
Svinesundsbron - bridge toll - E6
Sundsvall Bridge - bridge toll - E4
Motalabron - bridge toll - RV50

Switzerland
Grand Saint Bernard tunnel
Munt la Schera tunnel

All motorways, including their tunnels, require a toll sticker which costs 40 francs per year (no shorter times available).

Taiwan
Freeway 1 (Taiwan)
Freeway 3 (Taiwan)
Freeway 5 (Taiwan)

Thailand

Turkey
OGS
Otoyol 1 -Istanbul Expressway (Bosphorus Bridge)-
Otoyol 2 -Istanbul Expressway (Fatih Sultan Mehmet Bridge)-
Otoyol 3 -Istanbul-Edirne Motorway-
Otoyol 4 -Istanbul-Ankara Motorway-
Otoyol 5 -Istanbul-İzmir
Otoyol 6 -Malkara-Lapseki
Otoyol 7 -Northern Marmara Motorway
Otoyol 21 -Ankara-Adana
Otoyol 31 -İzmir-Aydın Motorway-
Otoyol 32 -İzmir-Çeşme Motorway-
Otoyol 33 -Northern Izmir Motorway
Otoyol 51 -Adana-Mersin Motorway
Otoyol 52 -Adana-Şanlıurfa Motorway
Otoyol 53 -Adana-İskenderun Motorway

United Arab Emirates

In Dubai, the Salik toll system was introduced on 1 July 2007. In Dubai, there at tolls at the following locations:
 
Al Barsha

Al Garhoud

Al Maktoum

Al Mamzar South

Al Mamzar north

Al Safa

Airport Tunnel

United Kingdom

England
 Aldwark Bridge, North Yorkshire
 Batheaston Bridge, Somerset
 Cartford Bridge, Lancashire
 Clifton Suspension Bridge, Bristol
 Dartford Crossing, Essex and Kent
 Dulwich College Road, Greater London
 Durham City congestion charge, County Durham
 Dunham Bridge, Lincolnshire and Nottinghamshire
 Hartland Point Access Road, Devon
 Humber Bridge, East Riding of Yorkshire and Lincolnshire
 Itchen Bridge, Hampshire
 Kingsland Bridge, Shropshire
 Kingsway Tunnel, Merseyside
 London congestion charge, Greater London
 M6 Toll, Staffordshire, Warwickshire and West Midlands
 Mersey Gateway Bridge, Cheshire
 Middlesbrough Transporter Bridge, County Durham and North Yorkshire
 Queensway Tunnel, Merseyside
 Rye Road, Hertfordshire
 Sandwich Bay Estate, Kent
 Silver Jubilee Bridge, Cheshire (Once re-opened after renovation)
 Swinford Bridge, Oxfordshire
 Tamar Bridge, Cornwall and Devon (eastbound only)
 Tyne Tunnel, Tyne and Wear
 Warburton Bridge, Cheshire and Greater Manchester
 Whitchurch Bridge, Berkshire and Oxfordshire
 Whitney-on-Wye toll bridge, Herefordshire
 Second Severn Crossing, Gloucestershire (historic)
 Severn Bridge, Gloucestershire (historic)

Wales
 Cleddau Bridge, Pembrokeshire
 Newport Transporter Bridge, Newport
 Pont Briwet, Gwynedd
 Second Severn Crossing, Monmouthshire (historic)
 Severn Bridge, Monmouthshire (historic)

United States

Zambia 
26 Tollgates
 T1
Kebby Musokotwane, Daniel Munkombwe
 T2
Shimabala, Katuba, Manyumbi, George Kunda SC, Chilonga
 T3
Kafulafuta, Michael Chilufya Sata, Wilson Mofya Chakulya
 T4
Chongwe, Alexander Grey Zulu, Reuben C Kamanga
 T5
Humphrey Mulemba, Enoch Kavindele
 M1
Kateshi
 M3
Kalense, Ntoposhi
 M9
Mumbwa, Mweeke
 M10
Lui
 M16
Sabina
 D1
Kakonde
 D94
Mibenge
 D319
Tapo
 D486
Mpongwe

See also 
Geography of toll roads

References

Toll